Impeachment of the President of the Russian Federation is part of the parliamentary procedure of the Federal Assembly of Russia and provides a legal way of removing the Russian President from office.

The impeachment procedure was carried out three times. All three times were against President Boris Yeltsin, and all three attempts failed.

Legal procedure 

In accordance with the current Russian legislation, the removal from office of the President is regulated by article 93 of the Constitution. It provides for indictment (impeachment) by the State Duma and should be accompanied by the opinion of the Supreme Court of Russia and Constitutional Court of Russia on observance of prescribed procedure for charging. After indictment, the decision to remove a president from office is voted on by the Federation Council.

The decision of the State Duma to indict and the decision of the Federation Council to remove the President from office must be accepted by two thirds of the respective chambers (300 and 114 votes respectively). The initiative to vote on indictment must be supported by no fewer than one third (150) of deputies of the State Duma and the conclusion of a special Commission formed by the State Duma. The decision of the Federation Council on removal from office of the President of the Russian Federation must be accepted by vote no later than three months after the bringing of charges by the State Duma against the President. If within this period the Federation Council does not vote for removal, charges against the President shall be considered rejected.

The deprivation of an ex-president of his or her immunity is regulated in the same way by Article 93.

Impeachment history

Number of deputies who voted in favour of the May 1999 impeachment proceedings, by factions

References

External link 
 

Russia
Presidency of Russia